In neuroscience, a population vector is the sum of the preferred directions of a population of neurons, weighted by the respective spike counts.

The formula for computing the (normalized) population vector, takes the following form:

Note that the vector  encodes the input direction, in terms of the activation of a population of neurons.

Computational neuroscience